Masked Singer Sverige is the  Swedish version of Masked Singer. The first season started on 26 March 2021 on TV4. Presenter for both the first and second season of the show is David Hellenius. The expertpanel for both seasons consists of Nour El Refai, Felix Herngren, Pernilla Wahlgren and Måns Zelmerlöw, who every week will get to guess who the secret celebrity singer is.

A second season of the show started on March 25, 2022 and ended on May 20, 2022.

A third season of the show is set to premiere on March 31, 2023.

Series overview

References

External links 
 
 

Masked Singer
TV4 (Sweden) original programming